Halldóra is an Icelandic given name which is the feminine form of Halldór.

List of people with the given name 

 Halldóra Briem (1913–1993), Icelandic architect
 Halldóra Eldjárn (1923–2008), first lady of Iceland
 Halldóra Eyjólfsdóttir (died 1210), Icelandic abbess
 Halldóra Geirharðsdóttir (born 1968), Icelandic actress and musician
 Halldóra Ísleifsdóttir (born 1970), Icelandic visual communication designer, artist, and design activist
 Halldóra Mogensen (born 1979), Icelandic politician
 Halldóra Sigvaldadóttir (died circa 1544), Icelandic abbess
 Halldóra K. Thoroddsen (1950–2020), Icelandic writer
 Halldóra Tumadóttir (1180–1247), Icelandic political figure

Given names
Icelandic feminine given names